The Adventures of Tom Sawyer is a video game for the Nintendo Entertainment System in 1989 by SETA and was based upon the 1876 book The Adventures of Tom Sawyer by Mark Twain.

Gameplay
The Adventures of Tom Sawyer is a platformer similar to The Goonies 1 or 2, wherein one plays as Tom Sawyer. The game is not to be confused with Square's Tom Sawyer. Inexplicably, the level order is changed in the English version (perhaps so as not to confuse players by starting with the rafting stage). The Japanese original's level 5, the pirate ship, is the English version's level 1, both making the beginning of the game much more difficult, and making the plot noncohesive.

Plot
Tom Sawyer is dreaming, and in this dream he must save Becky from Injun Joe, travelling through six stages to get to her. He encounters various creatures, including a giant octopus, a giant alligator in the Mississippi River, ghosts and ghouls in a haunted house, and a dragon. He wakes up from the dream and finds himself in his Missouri classroom, where he finds one feather on his desk that had belonged to Injun Joe.  It is never made clear whether or not the events of the game were real.

References

External links

1989 video games
Nintendo Entertainment System games
Nintendo Entertainment System-only games
SETA Corporation games
Video games set in the 19th century
Video games set in the United States
Works based on The Adventures of Tom Sawyer
Video games developed in Japan
Winkysoft games
Multiplayer and single-player video games
Podu kha